RFL is the abbreviation for the Rugby Football League, the governing body for rugby league football in England.

RFL may also refer to:

Radio frequency lesioning, a medical procedure 
Rangpur Foundry Limited (PRAN-RFL Group), a Bangladeshi conglomerate
Regional Football League, a defunct American football league that operated in 1999
Relay For Life, a community-based fundraising event for the American Cancer Society
Restoring Family Links, services provided by the Red Cross and Red Crescent movement
Road Fund Licence, a historical UK term for what is now Vehicle Excise Duty
Robot Fighting League, an organization promoting robotic sports

See also
List of filename extensions
ROFL